The 1986 UEFA European Under-21 Championship was the 5th staging of the UEFA European Under-21 Championship. The qualifying stage spanned two years (1984–86), had 29 entrants. Spain U-21s won the competition after a penalty shootout, the first in the U-21 competition's history.

The 29 national teams were divided into eight groups (five groups of 4 + three groups of 3). The group winners played off against each other on a two-legged home-and-away basis until the winner was decided.  There was no finals tournament or 3rd-place playoff.

Qualifying stage

Draw
The allocation of teams into qualifying groups was based on that of 1986 FIFA World Cup qualification with several changes, reflecting the absence of some nations:
 Group 1 did not include Belgium (moved to Group 8)
 Group 2 did not include Malta
 Group 3 did not include Northern Ireland
 Group 4 did not include Luxembourg (moved to Group 8)
 Group 5 featured the same nations
 Group 6 did not include Republic of Ireland
 Group 7 did not include Wales
 Group 8 composed of Belgium (moved from Group 1), Luxembourg (moved from Group 4) and Italy (who did not participate in World Cup qualification)

Qualified teams

1 Bold indicates champion for that year

Squads
See 1986 UEFA European Under-21 Championship squads

Knockout stage

References

UEFA European Under-21 Championship
UEFA competitions
Under-21 association football
European youth sports competitions
1986 in European football
1986 in European sport